{{Infobox officeholder 
| name                = Hassan Raza Pasha
| native_name         = 
| honorific-suffix    =
| image               = 
| imagesize           =
| smallimage          =
| caption             =
| order               =
| office              = Chairman Executive, Punjab Bar Council| term_start          =
| term_end            =
| vicepresident       =
| lieutenant          =
| monarch             =
| president           =
| primeminister       =
| governor            =
| governor-general    =
| governor_general    =
| constituency        =
| majority            =
| order2              =
| office2             =
| term_start2         =
| term_end2           =
| vicepresident2      =
| viceprimeminister2  =
| deputy2             =
| lieutenant2         =
| monarch2            =
| president2          =
| primeminister2      =
| governor2           =
| succeeding2         =
| predecessor2        =
| successor2          =
| constituency2       =
| majority2           =
| birth_place         =  Pakistan 
| death_date          =
| death_place         =
| nationality         = Pakistan 
| residence           = Pakistan
| signature           =
| website             =
| footnotes           =
}}Hassan Raza Pasha''' is a lawyer of Chakwal who was elected as chairman executive of the Punjab Bar Council. His father is also a lawyer.  Mr. Pasha was a justice of the Lahore High Court and elected as member Pakistan bar council in 2020.

References

Pakistani lawyers
Living people
Punjab Bar Council
Punjabi people
Year of birth missing (living people)